Doston Ibragimov (born 23 January 1997) is an Uzbekistani footballer who plays as a midfielder for FC G'ijduvon.

International career
Ibragimov made his professional debut for the Uzbekistan national football team in a friendly 2–0 loss to Turkey on 2 June 2019.

References

External links

Doston Ibragimov at PFL

1997 births
Living people
People from Navoiy Region
Uzbekistani footballers
Uzbekistan international footballers
Uzbekistan youth international footballers
Association football midfielders
Uzbekistan Super League players
Pakhtakor Tashkent FK players
Buxoro FK players
FC Qizilqum Zarafshon players
FK Dinamo Samarqand players